Treaty of Huế may refer to:

 Treaty of Huế (1863)
 Treaty of Huế (1883)
 Treaty of Huế (1884)